Timofey Kuznetsov (born 1991) is a Russian professional poker player who specializes in online no-limit Texas hold 'em and pot-limit Omaha hold'em cash games.

Poker career
Kuznetsov plays under the alias "Trueteller" on PokerStars and has earned over $2,400,000., as well as a further $2,050,000 under the same alias on the now defunct Full Tilt Poker. In November 2015, he played Phil Ivey in a 30-hour session. He won over $100,000 in two weeks playing online in March 2017.

Kuznetsov finished 4th in the 2015 $500,000 Super High Roller Bowl winning over $2,100,000.

In 2018, Kuznetsov along with Linus Loeliger and Jonas Mols, was ranked by poker player Andres "Educa-p0ker" Artinano as one of the top three 6-max no-limit hold 'em players in the world. In March 2018, Kuznetsov lost a $157,425.70 pot online after getting all the money in preflop holding  against Mols who held . They agreed to run the board twice. The first board ran out  and the second board came  giving the entire pot to Mols.

As of 2017, his total live tournament winnings exceed $2,900,000.

References

External links
 Timofey Kuznetsov on PokerNews

1991 births
Russian poker players
Living people